Thomas Arthur Eldridge (22 September 1923 – 18 January 2006) was an Australian rules footballer who played with Carlton in the Victorian Football League (VFL).

Family
The son of Alfred William Eldridge (1893-1982), and Minne Elizabeth Eldridge (1897-1970), née Long, Thomas Arthur Eldridge was born in Melbourne on 22 September 1923.

He married Joyce Theresa Hopgood (1925-1960) in 1943. He remarried in 1964. His second wife was Dorothy May Maxfield (1934-2007).

Military service
Eldridge enlisted to serve in the Australian Army during World War II in late 1941, soon after his eighteenth birthday. He served with the 59th Battalion, a unit trained for the defence of northern Australia, and served in New Guinea for six months in 1943. He was wounded in action in 1943. At the end of the war he returned to Melbourne and was discharged in February 1946.

Football

Carlton (VFL)
Soon his discharge, Eldridge was listed in the Carlton squad. He made his senior debut, at full-forward, in the match against Geelong, at Princes Park, on 17 June 1946. Carlton won comfortably but Eldridge managed just one goal, and was dropped to the reserves bench the following week. All but one of his remaining Carlton appearances were from the bench.

Yarraville (VFA)
In 1947 he transferred to Yarraville Football Club — without a clearance — where he served as captain in 1951 and 1952.

Death
He died at Clontarf, Queensland on 18 January 2006.

Notes

References
 
 
 World War Two Nominal Roll: Private Thomas Arthur Eldridge (V310706), Department of Veterans' Affairs.
 World War Two Service Record: Private Thomas Arthur Eldridge (V310706), National Archives of Australia.

External links 
 
 
 Thomas Eldridge, at The VFA Project.
 Tom Eldridge's profile at Blueseum

1923 births
Australian rules footballers from Melbourne
Carlton Football Club players
Yarraville Football Club players
2006 deaths
Australian Army personnel of World War II
Australian Army soldiers
Military personnel from Melbourne